The black-crowned tchagra (Tchagra senegalus) is a bushshrike. This family of passerine birds is closely related to the true shrikes in the family Laniidae, and was once included in that group.

This species is found in the Arabian peninsula and most of Africa in scrub, open woodland, semi-desert and cultivation.

Taxonomy
In 1760 the French zoologist Mathurin Jacques Brisson included a description of the black-crowned tchagra in his  based on a specimen collected in Senegal. He used the French name  and the Latin . Although Brisson coined Latin names, these do not conform to the binomial system and are not recognised by the International Commission on Zoological Nomenclature. When in 1766 the Swedish naturalist Carl Linnaeus updated his Systema Naturae for the twelfth edition, he added 240 species that had been previously described by Brisson. One of these was the black-crowned tchagra. Linnaeus included a brief description, coined the binomial name Lanius senegalus and cited Brisson's work. The species is now placed in the genus Tchagra that was introduced by the French naturalist René Lesson in 1831. Nine subspecies are recognised.

Description

The black-crowned tchagra is a colourful and unmistakable species, 19–22 cm in length. It has a black crown and eye stripes separated by a broad white supercilium. The underparts are pale grey and the upperparts pale brown. The folded wings are chestnut and the tail is black, tipped white. The bill is black.

Sexes are similar, but young birds have a brown cap and a pale yellow bill. There are 14 subspecies, varying in size and the colour of the back, underparts and eyestripe.

Black-crowned tchagra has a descending whistling song, and can be readily tempted into sight by imitating this call, presumably because the bird is concerned that there is an intruder in its territory. The male also has a switchback display flight.

Behaviour
Black-crowned tchagra lays two or three heavily marked white eggs in a cup nest in a tree or bush. Both sexes, but mainly the female, incubate for 12–15 days to hatching; the chicks fledge after another 15 days.

It is similar in habits to the shrikes, hunting insects and other small prey from a perch in a bush, although it sits less conspicuously than true shrikes.

References 

 Barlow, Wacher and Disley, Birds of The Gambia, 
 Sinclair, Hockey and Tarboton, SASOL Birds of Southern Africa, 
 Tony Harris and Kim Franklin, Shrikes & Bush Shrikes (Christopher Helm, 2000)

External links
 Black-crowned tchagra - Species text in The Atlas of Southern African Birds.
 Black-crowned tchagra videos, photos & sounds on the Internet Bird Collection
 BirdLife Species Factsheet 

black-crowned tchagra
Birds of Africa
Birds of the Middle East
black-crowned tchagra
black-crowned tchagra